Rajasthan Royals (RR) is a franchise cricket team based in Jaipur, India, which plays in the Indian Premier League (IPL). They were one of the nine teams that competed in the 2012 Indian Premier League. They were captained by Rahul Dravid. Rajasthan Royals finished 7th in the IPL and did not qualify for the champions league T20.

IPL

Standings
Rajasthan Royals finished 7th in the league stage of IPL 2012.

Match log

References

2012 Indian Premier League
Rajasthan Royals seasons